The following is a timeline of the presidency of Bill Clinton, from January 1, 1999 to December 31, 1999.

January 
 January 7 – The Senate trial on the removal from office of President Clinton began.
January 19 – President Clinton delivered his annual State of the Union Address before a joint session of Congress.

February 
February 12 – President Clinton was acquitted by the United States Senate on charges of "perjury" in a vote of 45–55 and "obstruction of justice" in a vote of 50–50, ending the impeachment trial.

March

April 
April 20 – Clinton addressed the nation about the Columbine High School massacre.

May

June 

 June 16–17 – Clinton met with President of France Jacques Chirac.

July 
 July 15 – President Clinton called on Congress to pass gun control legislation while speaking in the South Lawn. 
 July 16 – President Clinton delivered an address at Amos Hiatt Middle School in Des Moines, Iowa.

August

September

October

November 

 November 21–23 – President Clinton visited Bulgaria and met with President Petar Stoyanov and Prime Minister Ivan Kostov.

December

References

External links 
 Miller Center Clinton Presidential Timeline

See also 

 Timeline of the Bill Clinton presidency, for an index of the Clinton presidency timeline articles

Presidency of Bill Clinton
1999